The Takou bent-toed gecko (Cyrtodactylus takouensis) is a species of gecko that is endemic to southern Vietnam.

References 

Cyrtodactylus
Reptiles described in 2008